Hypericum mysorense is a species of flowering plant in the Hypericaceae family. It is primarily found at high elevations in the Western Ghats of India and the mountains of Sri Lanka, but was also reported from Socoro by Isaac Bayley Balfour in the 19th century.  It was studied to improve understanding of endosperm formation in Hypericum, and the identification of a number of xanthone derivatives from this species contributed to the chemotaxonomic description of subfamily Hypericoideae.

Hypericum mysorense has been used to treat wounds as part of the Ayurvedic system of traditional medicine.  Some research into the possibility of antiherpetic properties in H. mysorense extracts has been performed.

References

External links

mysorense
Flora of India (region)
Flora of Sri Lanka
Plants described in 1831
Flora of the Western Ghats